Triggerfinger is a Belgian rock band from Lier, Belgium, formed in 1998. The band consists of vocalist and guitarist Ruben Block, bassist Paul Van Bruystegem and Mario Goossens (formerly of Winterville) as drummer.

Musical career
The band gained popularity while performing prior to the band's debut album. They released their self-titled debut album Triggerfinger in 2004, after previously having released the singles Inner Peace and Camaro from the album. The album was well received by rock fans, with the band's sound being compared to bands such as Queens of the Stone Age, by the younger audience, and Led Zeppelin, by the older rock fans.

The album was followed by a live album called Faders Up, which featured several of their previous album's songs as well as a few covers of other bands. The following year, they released their next studio album called What Grabs Ya?, which, despite efforts, failed to make the band break through. In 2009, What Grabs Ya? was re-issued, with several new songs added to the track list.

The third studio album, All This Dancin' Around, was released in November 2010. The recordings of this album took place in the Sound City Studios in North Hollywood, California. The release of this album managed to increase the band's popularity with moderate success.

They are listed as support act in many European dates of the 2011 tour of the band Within Temptation.

In April 2012, an acoustic cover of Lykke Li's pop hit "I Follow Rivers" reached number one in Belgium and abroad in the Netherlands and Austria.

On 7 July 2012 they performed before the Wladimir Klitschko vs. Tony Thompson heavyweight title fight, which took place in Bern, Switzerland.

On 8 December 2012 they won four Belgian Music Industry Awards or MIAs (hit of the year, best group, best alternative music and best live-act).

The band supported the Rolling Stones on 6 July 2013 during the Barclaycard Summer Time Festival in Hyde Park, London.

On 4 November 2013 they started recording their fourth studio album in Los Angeles, which was released on 18 April 2014. The name of the album is By Absence Of The Sun.

In 2017, the band signed to Mascot Records and released their fifth studio album: Colossus.

Discography 

Studio albums
 Triggerfinger (2004)
 What Grabs Ya? (2008)
 All This Dancin' Around (2010)
 By Absence of the Sun (2014)
 Colossus (2017)

Live albums
 Faders Up (2007)
 Faders Up 2 (2012)

Extended plays
 Driveby (2013)

References

External links

Label website

Belgian musical trios
Musical groups established in 1998
Belgian rock music groups
Belgian blues rock musical groups